Margarethe Faas-Hardegger (20 February 1882 in Bern – 23 September 1963 in Minusio) was a Swiss women's rights activist, trade unionist and the leading figure of the Swiss women workers' movement at the beginning of the 20th century. Her leadership saw the Swiss women workers' movement gain a political and feminist profile. Faas-Hardegger made women's suffrage part of the Swiss trade unions' platform, as well as maternity insurance and the idea of paid housework.

Biography
Margarethe Hardegger trained as a telephone switchboard operator and obtained a late Matura diploma with the support of her later husband, the lawyer August Faas. She had two daughters, Olga and Lisa, with Faas, whom she married in 1903 and divorced in 1912. Since 1916 she cohabited with the German carpenter Hans Brunner.

In 1903, Hardegger co-founded the Bernese Textile Workers' Association. In 1905, she became the first women workers' secretary of the Swiss Federation of Trade Unions (SGB), abandoning law school to obtain the post. She founded several trade union sections and consumer cooperatives, as well as the women's newspapers Die Vorkämpferin and L'Exploitée. In 1909, the active syndicalist and antimilitarist was let go from the SGB after continued political disagreements with the union leadership.

After leaving the SGB, Hardegger focused on her work in the Socialist League, which she had co-founded with Gustav Landauer in 1908, and its magazine The Socialist. She campaigned for the use of contraceptives, and was arrested in Valais for "distributing immoral literature". But her support of women's rights and free love put her at odds with Landauer as well. After she was convicted of perjury on behalf of Ernst Frick in 1913, Landauer had her expelled from the Socialist League. In 1915, she was again convicted, to one year's imprisonment, for assisting in the procuration of abortions.

Subsequently she principally focused on the idea of free love. In 1919, she founded a countryside commune in Herrliberg near Zürich, and in 1920 the phalanstère „Villino Graziella“ in Minusio, near Locarno, Ascona and the artists' colony of Monte Verità. Both projects eventually failed because of a lack of funds and internal disagreements. She continued working in a family enterprise with Hans Brunner, whom she married in 1950.

References

Further reading
 Regula Bochsler: Auszug aus Ägypten. Margarethe Hardegger und die Siedlungspioniere des sozialistischen Bundes im Tessin, in: Andreas Schwab, Claudia Lafranconi (eds.): Sinnsuche und Sonnenbad. Experimente in Kunst und Leben auf dem Monte Verità. Limmat, Zürich 2001, .
 Regula Bochsler: Der Überfall auf die Zürcher Polizeikaserne 1907, in: Dehmlow Raimund, Gottfried Heuer (Hrsg.): Bohème, Psychoanalyse & Revolution. 3. Internationaler Otto Gross Kongress: Ludwig-Maximilians-Universität, München 15.-17. März 2002. LiteraturWissenschaft.de, Marburg an der Lahn 2003, .
 Regula Bochsler: Ich folgte meinem Stern. Das kämpferische Leben der Margarethe Hardegger.  Pendo, Zürich 2004, .
 Ina Boesch: Gegenleben. Die Sozialistin Margarethe Hardegger und ihre politischen Bühnen. Chronos, Zürich 2003, .
 Monica Studer: Der Schweizerische Gewerkschaftsbund 1905-1909 und seine Sekretärin Margarethe Faas. In: Ernest Bornemann (ed.): Arbeiterbewegung und Feminismus. Berichte aus vierzehn Länder, Ullstein, Frankfurt am Main 1982, .

External links
 
 
 Website about Margarethe Hardegger

1882 births
1963 deaths
Swiss women's rights activists
Swiss trade unionists
20th-century Swiss writers
20th-century Swiss women writers
Swiss socialist feminists